A quantum t-design is a probability distribution over either pure quantum states or unitary operators which can duplicate properties of the probability distribution over the Haar measure for polynomials of degree t or less. Specifically, the average of any polynomial function of degree t over the design is exactly the same as the average over Haar measure. Here the Haar measure is a uniform probability distribution over all quantum states or over all unitary operators. Quantum t-designs are so called because they are analogous to t-designs in classical statistics, which arose historically in connection with the problem of design of experiments.  Two particularly important types of t-designs in quantum mechanics are projective and unitary t-designs.

A spherical design is a collection of points on the unit sphere for which polynomials of bounded degree can be averaged over to obtain the same value that integrating over surface measure on the sphere gives. Spherical and projective t-designs derive their names from the works of Delsarte, Goethals, and Seidel in the late 1970s, but these objects played earlier roles in several branches of mathematics, including numerical integration and number theory. Particular examples of these objects have found uses in quantum information theory, quantum cryptography, and other related fields.

Unitary t-designs are analogous to spherical designs in that they reproduce the entire unitary group via a finite collection of unitary matrices. The theory of unitary 2-designs was developed in 2006  specifically to achieve a practical means of efficient and scalable randomized benchmarking to assess the errors in quantum computing operations, called gates. Since then unitary t-designs have been found useful in other areas of quantum computing and more broadly in quantum information theory and applied to problems as far reaching as the black hole information paradox. Unitary t-designs are especially relevant to randomization tasks in quantum computing since ideal operations are usually represented by unitary operators.

Motivation 
In a d-dimensional Hilbert space when averaging over all quantum pure states the natural group is SU(d), the special unitary group of dimension d. The Haar measure is, by definition, the unique group-invariant measure, so it is used to average properties that are not unitarily invariant over all states, or over all unitaries.

A particularly widely used example of this is the spin  system. For this system the relevant group is SU(2) which is the group of all 2x2 unitary operators. Since every 2x2 unitary operator is a rotation of the Bloch sphere, the Haar measure for spin-1/2 particles is invariant under all rotations of the Bloch sphere. This implies that the Haar measure is the rotationally invariant measure on the Bloch sphere, which can be thought of as a constant density distribution over the surface of the sphere.

An important class of complex projective t-designs, are symmetric informationally complete positive operator-valued measures POVM's, which are complex projective 2-design. Since such 2-designs must have at least  elements, a SIC-POVM is a minimal sized complex projective 2-designs.

Spherical t-Designs 
Complex projective t-designs have been studied in quantum information theory as quantum t-designs.

Formally, we define a probability distribution over quantum states  to be a  complex projective t-design if

Here, the integral over states is taken over the Haar measure on the unit sphere in 

Exact t-designs over quantum states cannot be distinguished from the uniform probability distribution over all states when using t copies of a state from the probability distribution. However in practice even t-designs may be difficult to compute. For this reason approximate t-designs are useful.

Approximate t-designs are most useful due to their ability to be efficiently implemented. i.e. it is possible to generate a quantum state  distributed according to the probability distribution  in  time.
This efficient construction also implies that the POVM of the operators  can be implemented in  time.

The technical definition of an approximate t-design is:

If 

and 

then  is an -approximate t-design.

It is possible, though perhaps inefficient, to find an -approximate t-design consisting of quantum pure states for a fixed t.

Construction
For convenience d is assumed to be a power of 2.

Using the fact that for any d there exists a set of  functions {0,...,d-1}  {0,...,d-1} such that for any distinct  {0,...,d-1} the image under f, where f is chosen at random from S, is exactly the uniform distribution over tuples of N elements of {0,...,d-1}.

Let  be drawn from the Haar measure.

Using this and Gaussian quadrature we can construct  so that  is an approximate t-design.

Unitary t-Designs 

Unitary t-designs are analogous to spherical designs in that they reproduce the entire unitary group via a finite collection of unitary matrices. The theory of unitary 2-designs was developed in 2006  specifically to achieve a practical means of efficient and scalable randomized benchmarking to assess the errors in quantum computing operations, called gates. Since then unitary t-designs have been found useful in other areas of quantum computing and more broadly in quantum information theory and in fields as far reaching as black hole physics. Unitary t-designs are especially relevant to randomization tasks in quantum computing since ideal operations are usually represented by unitary operators.

Elements of a unitary t-design are elements of the unitary group, U(d), the group of  unitary matrices. A t-design of unitary operators will generate a t-design of states.

Suppose  is a unitary t-design (i.e. a set of unitary operators).  Then for any pure state  let .  Then  will always be a t-design for states.

Formally define a unitary t-design, X, if

Observe that the space linearly spanned by the matrices  over all choices of U is identical to the restriction  and  This observation leads to a conclusion about the duality between unitary designs and unitary codes.

Using the permutation maps it is possible to verify directly that a set of unitary matrices forms a t-design.

One direct result of this is that for any finite 

With equality if and only if X is a t-design.

1 and 2-designs have been examined in some detail and absolute bounds for the dimension of X, |X|, have been derived.

Bounds for unitary designs

then X is a unitary t-design.

It follows that X is a unitary t-design if and only if .

From the above it is demonstrable that if X is a t-design then  is an absolute bound for the design.  This imposes an upper bound on the size of a unitary design. This bound is absolute meaning it depends only on the strength of the design or the degree of the code, and not the distances in the subset, X.

A unitary code is a finite subset of the unitary group in which a few inner product values occur between elements. Specifically, a unitary code is defined as a finite subset  if for all  in X  takes only distinct values.

It follows that  and if U and M are orthogonal:

See also 

 Spherical design
 Equiangular lines
 Welch bounds

References 

Quantum information science
Information theory
Quantum information theory